Randy Raine-Reusch (born 1952) is a Canadian composer, performer, improviser, and multi-instrumentalist specializing in New and Experimental Music for instruments from around the world, particularly those from East and Southeast Asia.

Research
Raine-Reusch studied at the Creative Music Studio in the 1977 with artists such as Frederic Rzewski, Jack Dejohnette, and Karl Berger, playing only an Appalachian dulcimer. In 1984, he received funding from the Canada Council for the Arts to undertake study overseas in Indonesia, Burma, and Thailand. He studied khaen in Mahasarakham, Thailand with master musicians Nukan Srichrangthin and Sombat Sinla. After meeting famed Samul Nori drumming Kim Duk Soo in 1986, Raine-Reusch remained in Korea after a concert performance in 1987 to study kayageum with Living National Treasure (South Korea) Park Gwii Hi. He studied didjeridu in Australia while performing at World Expo 88 in Brisbane. 1n 1989, Raine-Reusch returned to Thailand to study khaen, then undertook research on traditional mouth organs in the upriver regions of Sarawak, in southern China, and finally studied the sho in Kyushu, Japan, including lessons with Living National Treasure (Japan) Ono Tada Aki. In 1992, Raine-Reusch studied intensively in Hawaii with Chie Yamada on the Japanese ichigenkin, which he continued in 1996 in Tokyo under the Seikyodo School. Raine-Reusch returned to Borneo on repeated trips throughout 1997 and 1998 to research and record the traditional music of Sarawak, resulting in two CDs on the Pan Records label.

With a collection of approximately 1000 instruments, Raine-Reusch regularly performs on the Chinese guzheng, bawu, hulusi and xun; the Japanese shō and ichigenkin; the Korean kayageum; the Thai khaen and pin pia; the Australian didjeridu; and the Appalachian dulcimer.

Collaboration
Raine-Reusch has recorded with Pauline Oliveros, Deep Listening Band, Aerosmith, The Cranberries, Yes, Raffi, David Amram, Jon Gibson, Jin Hi Kim, and Henry Kaiser as well with as his own intercultural quartet, ASZA.  He has performed with a wide range of artists including: Aerosmith, Robert Dick, Mats Gustafsson, Barry Guy, Sainkho Namtchylak, Pauline Oliveros, Trichy Sankaran, Paul Plimley, Miya Masaoka and Issui Minegishi, the Japanese Iemoto, or Hereditary Grand Master, of Seikyodo Ichigenkin. He also performs in a duo with his wife, the Chinese zheng virtuoso and scholar Mei Han.

Other work
Other credits include two Juno Award nominations, a performance on the famed American PBS “Prairie Home Companion,” and appearing in five documentary films on music.

He was the co-founder of the Rainforest World Music Festival held in Malaysia. He returned in 1998 as the Artistic Director and Consultant for both the Rainforest World Music Festival held just outside Kuching, Malaysia, and the Miri International Jazz Festival in Miri, Malaysia, re-branded in 2010 as Borneo Jazz. Both festivals are overseen by the Sarawak Tourist Board. He was a music consultant for the Korean Arts Management Service, the Sarawak Tourist Board, and Cirque du Soleil's Quidam.

He was the former Director of Acquisitions for the Musical Instrument Museum, which opened in early 2010 in Phoenix, Arizona. He also has been an instrument consultant for the Stearn's Collection at the University of Michigan, Ann Arbor and the Museum of Making Music in Carlsbad, California.

Raine-Reusch is an affiliate of the Canadian Music Centre, a member of the Canadian League of Composers, Board member of the Museum of World Music, a former Board Member of the Canadian New Music Network, and the Executive Director for the Red Chamber Cultural Society.

Discography

With Deep Listening Band, and Joe McPhee
2013 - Looking Back

With Henry Kaiser, and 
2012 - Kamüra

With Stuart Dempster, Jon Gibson, Jin Hi Kim, William O. Smith (Bill Smith), Barry Truax
2005 - Bamboo, Silk & Stone

With Mei Han
2001 - Distant Wind: New Direction For Chinese Zheng

With Yes
1999 - The Ladder

With Barry Guy, Robert Dick
1999 - Gudira

With Pauline Oliveros
1998 - In the Shadow of the Phoenix

With The Cranberries
1996 - To the Faithful Departed

With Raffi
1994 - Bananaphone

With Aerosmith
1989 - Pump

With David Cross and Peter Banks
2020 - Crossover

Books
 Play the World - a 101 World Instrument Primer, Mel Bay Productions

Interviews
Extensive Randy Raine-Reusch interview at AsiAmerican DreaMusic

References

External links

1952 births
20th-century Canadian composers
20th-century flautists
21st-century Canadian composers
21st-century flautists
Appalachian dulcimer players
Canadian male composers
Canadian multi-instrumentalists
Canadian performance artists
Guzheng players
Living people
Shakuhachi players
Shō players